Neohipparion (Greek: "new" (neos), "pony" (hipparion)) is an extinct genus of equid, from the Neogene (Miocene to Pliocene) of North America and Central America.

References

Miocene horses
Pliocene horses
Prehistoric placental genera
Miocene mammals of North America
Pliocene mammals of North America
Clarendonian
Hemphillian
Fossil taxa described in 1903